The 1994 Winston Select 500 was the ninth stock car race of the 1994 NASCAR Winston Cup Series season and the 25th iteration of the event. The race was held on Sunday, July 24, 1994, before an audience of 150,000 in Lincoln, Alabama, at Talladega Superspeedway, a  permanent triangle-shaped superspeedway. The race took the scheduled 188 laps to complete. In the final laps of the race, Richard Childress Racing driver Dale Earnhardt would make a charge to the front with six to go, defending the lead for the final five laps to take his 62nd career NASCAR Winston Cup Series victory and his third victory of the season. To fill out the top three, Robert Yates Racing driver Ernie Irvan and Bahari Racing driver Michael Waltrip would finish second and third, respectively.

Background 

Talladega Superspeedway, originally known as Alabama International Motor Superspeedway (AIMS), is a motorsports complex located north of Talladega, Alabama. It is located on the former Anniston Air Force Base in the small city of Lincoln. The track is a tri-oval and was constructed in the 1960s by the International Speedway Corporation, a business controlled by the France family. Talladega is most known for its steep banking and the unique location of the start/finish line that's located just past the exit to pit road. The track currently hosts the NASCAR series such as the NASCAR Cup Series, Xfinity Series and the Camping World Truck Series. Talladega is the longest NASCAR oval, a  tri-oval like the Daytona International Speedway, which also is a  tri-oval.

Entry list 

 (R) denotes rookie driver.

Qualifying 
Qualifying was split into two rounds. The first round was held on Friday, April 29, at 4:00 PM EST. Each driver would have one lap to set a time. During the first round, the top 20 drivers in the round would be guaranteed a starting spot in the race. If a driver was not able to guarantee a spot in the first round, they had the option to scrub their time from the first round and try and run a faster lap time in a second round qualifying run, held on Saturday, April 30, at 11:30 AM EST. As with the first round, each driver would have one lap to set a time. For this specific race, positions 21-40 would be decided on time, and depending on who needed it, a select amount of positions were given to cars who had not otherwise qualified but were high enough in owner's points; up to two provisionals were given. If needed, a past champion who did not qualify on either time or provisionals could use a champion's provisional, adding one more spot to the field.

Seven drivers would fail to qualify.

Full qualifying results

Race results

Standings after the race 

Drivers' Championship standings

Note: Only the first 10 positions are included for the driver standings.

References 

Winston Select 500
Winston Select 500
NASCAR races at Talladega Superspeedway
May 1994 sports events in the United States